Lineal  is a geometric term of location which may refer to:

 pertaining to a lineage
 Lineal kinship or "Eskimo kinship"
 Lineal descendant, a blood relative in the direct line of descent
 Lineal primogeniture or "Absolute primogeniture"
 Lineal succession (Latter Day Saints), right of inheritance of church offices
 Lineal championship, in boxing, "the man who beats the man" takes his championship
 pertaining to a line
 Foot (length) or "lineal foot"
 Lineal typeface, with no serifs
 Ciudad Lineal, district of Madrid, Spain
 Lineal set of vectors from a vector space

Similar spellings
 lienal, pertaining to the spleen
 linea, any long marking, dark or bright, on a planet or moon's surface